Lucy Watson is a British journalist and newsreader.

Lucy Watson may also refer to:

Lucy Watson, in Made in Chelsea
Lucy Watson, wife of John Thornton (philanthropist)